Ömer Akgün (born 1 January 1982) is a Turkish sport shooter specialized in 10 m air rifle event.

Ömer Akgün was born into a family with 13 champion sport shooters in Dicle district of Diyarbakır Province, southeastern Turkey on 1 January 1982.

Impressed by his older brother, Akgün started shooting sport in 1996. He is a member of Diyarbakır Tennis and Shooting Club. He won the gold medal and the bronze medal in the Mixed event at the 2017 Islamic Solidarity Games in Baku, Azerbaijan. He competed at the 2018 Mediterranean Games in Tarragona, Spain. He set a national record with 630.1 points at the 2020 European Championship 10m in Wrocław, Poland, and obtained a quota for the 2020 Summer Olympics.

References

1982 births
Living people
People from Dicle
Sportspeople from Diyarbakır
Turkish male sport shooters
ISSF rifle shooters
Islamic Solidarity Games competitors for Turkey
Islamic Solidarity Games medalists in shooting
Mediterranean Games competitors for Turkey
Competitors at the 2018 Mediterranean Games
Shooters at the 2020 Summer Olympics
Olympic shooters of Turkey
21st-century Turkish people